The Madawaska River is a river in the Saint Lawrence River drainage basin in Ontario, Canada. Its name comes from an Algonquian band of the region known as "Matouweskarini", meaning "people of the shallows".

Geography
The Madawaska River rises at Source Lake in geographic Canisbay Township in the Unorganized South Part of Nipissing District, in the highlands of southern Algonquin Park. It flows east, dropping  before emptying into the Ottawa River at Arnprior.

Tributaries
 Opeongo River
 York River

Lakes and reservoirs
The lower portion of the Madawaska River supports several large lakes, including:
 Centennial Lake
 Black Donald Lake
 Calabogie Lake
 Madawaska Reservoir(Arnprior Head Pond)
 Kamaniskeg Lake

History
In the late 19th century, the river was used to transport lumber from the forested areas surrounding the river. Beginning in the 1960s, the river was used to generate hydroelectric power. Undammed sections of the river are also used for canoeing, kayaking and recreational fishing.

Around 1916, artist Tom Thomson followed the log drive down the river, painting the subject in The Drive (1916-17).

Fauna
The most common species of game fish found in this river include walleye (yellow pickerel), northern pike, muskellunge, smallmouth bass, and largemouth bass.

Hydroelectric Power
Ontario Power Generation (OPG) has 5 stations on the Madawaska. 

In June 2002 sluice gates at the Barrett Chute Generating Station were accidentally opened, killing two people, and injuring seven. OPG and two employees were charged with criminal negligence. Procedures at the plant were reviewed, and fencing added or repaired.

The Calabogie station is being upgraded in 2022 to double capacity from 5 MW to 10 MW. The original station was badly damaged by a tornado in September 2018. Clean up was completed in 2020. The project is expected to cost 100 million dollars.

Provincial parks
Two sections of the river are designated and protected as provincial waterway parks:
Upper Madawaska River Provincial Park, between Whitney and Madawaska; .
Lower Madawaska River Provincial Park, between Latchford Bridge and Griffith; .

Both parks are administered by Ontario Parks but are non-operating, meaning there are no visitor facilities or services available. Both are ideal for whitewater canoeing.

See also
Bonnechere River - nearby river with similar characteristics
List of Ontario rivers

References

Sources

External links

 Ontario Power Generation - History and water management

Rivers of Nipissing District
Rivers of Renfrew County